"Underneath Your Clothes" is a song by Colombian singer-songwriter Shakira for her third studio album and English-language debut, Laundry Service (2001). The power ballad was the second English-language single released from the album; being released on 11 February 2002. It features lyrics by Shakira with music and production from Shakira and Lester Mendez. Lyrically, the song tells the story of the unconditional love that a woman has for her boyfriend, with lyrics about being worthy of somebody's love. 

Some critics commended the song for being a highlight from the album. However, others were more critical towards her songwriting and the song's production, which according to them resembled the Bangles' "Eternal Flame" and the Beatles' "Penny Lane". The song became a success on the charts, topping the charts of seven countries, while also reaching the top ten in several countries, including the United States.

The accompanying music video for the song was directed by fashion photographer Herb Ritts. It depicts Shakira's loneliness as a tourist musician. It features Shakira's then-boyfriend Antonio de la Rúa, whose unpopularity in Argentina led to a ban of her albums there. Shakira promoted the song with a series of live performances across the world, while also performing it on her worldwide tours, Tour of the Mongoose (2002–2003), Oral Fixation Tour (2006–2007), The Sun Comes Out World Tour (2010–2011) and El Dorado World Tour (2018).

Background and release
After releasing her first live album, MTV Unplugged: Shakira (2000), which won her first Grammy Award, Shakira expressed the desire to breakthrough in the United States and the world with songs in English. With the help of a personal tutor, and after studying the lyrics of Bob Dylan and the poetry of Walt Whitman, she started writing songs in English "with a dictionary in one hand and a thesaurus in the other." During the songwriting process for Laundry Service, Shakira wrote "Underneath Your Clothes" as a love song for de la Rúa. She explained that, "If you check the subject of my songs, most of them talk about my own experiences and feelings and what I was actually going through in my life." "Underneath Your Clothes" was released to US radio stations as the second single from the album in February 2002, while the physical single was released in May 2002.

Composition and lyrics 

"Underneath Your Clothes" has lyrics by Shakira, and music and production by Shakira and Lester Mendez. Both arranged the track, while Mendez also provided keyboards and horn arrangements, while Shakira and Rita Quintero also serving with background vocals. It was recorded at The Hit Factory, Miami, Florida, Compass Point Studios, Bahamas, while being mixed and recorded at the Crescent Moon Studios, Miami, Florida. According to the sheet music published at MusicNotes.com by Sony/ATV Music Publishing, "Underneath Your Clothes" is written in the key of A  major, set in a moderately slow tempo of 88 beats per minute. Shakira's vocal range spans from the low-note of AB3 to the high-note of C5. The introduction follows the chord progression of A–D–A–D-Fm, while the verses follow the chord progression of Cm-D–Esus–E.

Lyrically, the song is an "ode" to the positivity one gains when pursuing a relationship with a good person, with Shakira "mentally undress[ing] her man, fantasizing about the 'territory' she claims as her own." As noted by Chuck Taylor of Billboard, the song is "a thought-provoking ballad that finds a novel way to deliver a message of love and devotion." "Underneath your clothes/There's an endless story/There's the man I chose/That's my territory," she sings. During the song, she "repeatedly describes herself as a good girl, worthy of her boyfriend's love, and as a woman of very developed maternal instincts." As noted by Alexis Petridis of The Guardian and Matt Cibula of PopMatters, the song has "a Beatles-influenced brass arrangement" and a melody from the Bangles' "Eternal Flame."

Critical reception
"Underneath Your Clothes" received good critical reception as it represented "a large part of Shakira's style". While calling her voice "odd", Chuck Taylor of Billboard wrote that it "dart[s] from a delicate, girlie, Jewel-like delivery to a determined, tough-chick croon - it certainly gives the song a signature edge and multiple layers that seem to draw out something new with each successive spin." Lisa Oliver of Yahoo! Music claimed to find similarities between Shakira's and Jewel's vocals, calling it "a Jewel-esque ground swelling". Ted Kessler of The Observer noted that the song "may be slightly kooky pop-rock, but it's sung by someone with the range of an operatic diva." Alex Henderson of AllMusic picked the song as a highlight from the album, while Robert Christgau wrote that its lyrics have an "awkward, carnal, unhesitatingly female chauvinist." Matt Cibula of PopMatters said that "it could have been a great little thing, [...] simple, graceful, light, but now it’s a damned mess," citing the "tell-tale touches" at the start, the Bangles’ "Eternal Flame" influence and "Penny Lane" trumpets by the end" as examples. Cibula called it "a potentially cool song [that] has been studioed out of existence." Frank Kogan of The Village Voice criticized the lyrics, calling it a song "with no fresh insights on the subject."

Accolades
"Underneath Your Clothes" is listed at number 391 on Blenders "The 500 Greatest Songs Since You Were Born" list. Bill Lamb of About.com picked the song at number four on his "Top 10 Shakira Pop Songs", while Robert Copsey of Digital Spy placed the song at number 3 on their "Shakira's 10 best songs", writing that it "remains the ultimate Shakira ballad for the mere fact that we can still remember every single world of it to this day." The website Latin Post ranked it as her eighth biggest hit, calling it "a powerful ballad." The song entered Billboards list of her Biggest Hits at number 5.

Commercial performance
The song was commercially successful and peaked atop the charts in Australia, Austria, and Belgium; being certified platinum in the three countries.<ref name=austriancert>{{cite web|title=Gold & Platin (Type Shakira in Interpret and then click Suchen') |url=http://www.ifpi.at/?section=goldplatin |publisher=IFPI Austria |access-date=16 November 2013 |language=de |url-status=dead |archive-url=https://web.archive.org/web/20090608024513/http://www.ifpi.at/?section=goldplatin |archive-date=8 June 2009}}</ref> In Australia, the song debuted at number two, peaking two weeks later at the top of the charts, while spending 20 weeks inside the ARIA Charts. In Austria, "Underneath Your Clothes" debuted at number two, remaining for three consecutive weeks at the position, before moving to the top the following week. The song topped the charts of Hungary, Ireland and Netherlands. In other countries, the song experienced commercial success, reaching number two in France, Germany, New Zealand, Norway and Switzerland.

In other countries, it became a top five or a top-10 hit. In the United States, "Underneath Your Clothes" entered the charts at number 70 in March 2002. In its fourth week, the song entered the top 40 at number 33, while cracking the top 20 two weeks later. The song eventually peaked at number nine, on the issue dated 18 May 2002 becoming her second top-10 hit on the chart. According to Sony Music Canada, the song has been certified as gold in the United States. In the United Kingdom, it reached number three, becoming her second consecutive top-three single. It entered "Eurochart Hot 100 Singles of 2002" at number five, while her other single "Whenever Wherever" was placed at number 2.

Music video
Background and storyline

American photographer Herb Ritts directed the music video for "Underneath Your Clothes", his last music video directorial effort before his death in December 2002. It starts with a black-and-white scene of a reporter asking Shakira how she feels about crossing over into the English-speaking music market, and the singer, ironically, answers him in Spanish. Shakira claimed in her "MTV Making the Video" of the song that the "Crossover" claims had been her daily bread, and that she heavily at wished for this to be included into the video. The video illustrates her loneliness as a music artist when she goes on tour. Then, scenes of the singer performing the song live with her band and passionately hugging her boyfriend (played by her real-life then boyfriend Antonio de la Rúa) are shown.

Reception
The appearance of Antonio de la Rua in the video led to music retailer Tower Records Argentina banning sales of her albums in the country. The reason behind the ban was that de la Rua's father Fernando de la Rúa, who was the President of Argentina at that time, had resigned "in the midst of profound economic and political turmoil in the country", and the decision to ban sales of Shakira's albums was a "direct protest against Antonio De la Rua - not Shakira".

Live performances
To promote the single, Shakira went on to a number of places. She performed the track on the television programs CD:UK , Domingo Legal, Late Show with David Letterman, TRL and the 2002 Party in the Park event at Hyde Park among others. The limited edition of the album, entitled Laundry Service: Washed & Dried (2002) presented an acoustic version of the song as a bonus track. She performed an acoustic version of the song on VH1 Divas Live in Las Vegas (2002). The singer's second live album, Live & Off the Record (2004), presented a live version of the song performed during an April 2003 concert in Rotterdam, Netherlands, which was part of the singer's Tour of the Mongoose (2002–2003). Shakira performed the song live at the concerts for her Oral Fixation Tour (2006–2007) and The Sun Comes Out World Tour (2010-2011), however the song was not in the set-list of the Spanish and Latin American concerts. The performances were included on the Oral Fixation Tour and the Live from Paris CD/DVD, respectively. Shakira presented a piano mix of the song at the "Ein Herz für Kinder" and "Clinton Global Initiative", with only vocals and piano, and excluded the complete second half of the song.

Cover versions
 Irish singer Kieran Goss covered "Underneath Your Clothes" for the charity album Even Better Than the Real Thing Vol. 1.
 Swedish singer Amy Diamond covered it on the Super Troupers compilation album.
 Brazilian girl group Rouge performed a Portuguese version called "Você Me Roubou" (You stole me).
 Diana in Series 7 of Spanish talent show Operación Triunfo (Operation Triumph) covered the song.
 Shakira performed the song with German band Big Soul on the season 1 finale of the German version of X Factor''.

Formats and track listings
CD maxi
 "Underneath Your Clothes" (album version) – 3:44
 "Underneath Your Clothes" (acoustic version) – 3:55
 "Underneath Your Clothes" (Mendez club radio edit) – 3:24
 "Underneath Your Clothes" (Thunderpuss club mix) – 6:52
 "Underneath Your Clothes" (video)

CD single
 "Underneath Your Clothes" (album version) – 3:44
 "Underneath Your Clothes" (acoustic version) – 3:55

Personnel
 Producer by Shakira
 Co-produced by Lester Mendez for Living Stereo
 Arranged by Shakira and Lester Mendez
 Keyboards: Lester Mendez
 Guitars: Tim Pierce and Brian Ray
 Bass: Paul Bushnell
 Percussion: Richard Bravo
 Drums: Abraham Laboriel Jr.
 Horn arrangements: Lester Mendez
 Horn charts and direction: Camilo Valencia
 Trumpet: Tony Concepción
 Trumpet and piccolo trumpet: Jim Hacker
 Baritone and tenor sax: Ed Calle
 Bass trombone and tuba: Joe Barati
 Trombone and bass trombone: Dane Teboe
 Background vocals: Shakira and Rita Quintero
 Recording engineers: Terry Manning, Javier Garza and Gustavo Celis
 Mixing engineer: Eric Schilling
 Additional engineers: Carlos Paucar, Mike Couzzi, Jorge González and Alfred Figueroa
 Assistant engineers: Jorge González,  Tony Mardini, Ken Theis, Ed Williams, Chris Carroll, Christine Tramontano, Nicholas Marshall, Oswald Bowe and Alex Dixon

Charts

Weekly charts

Year-end charts

Decade-end charts

Certifications

Release history

References

2000s ballads
2001 songs
2002 singles
Dutch Top 40 number-one singles
Epic Records singles
Irish Singles Chart number-one singles
Music video controversies
Music videos directed by Herb Ritts
Number-one singles in Australia
Number-one singles in Austria
Number-one singles in the Czech Republic
Number-one singles in Hungary
Number-one singles in Portugal
Rock ballads
Shakira songs
Song recordings produced by Lester Mendez
Songs written by Lester Mendez
Songs written by Shakira
Ultratop 50 Singles (Flanders) number-one singles